Lusk may refer to:

Places

U.S. places
 Lusk, Missouri, an unincorporated community
 Lusk, Tennessee, an unincorporated community
 Lusk, Wyoming, a town

Elsewhere
 Lusk, Dublin, a village in Ireland

Others
 Lusk (surname)
 Lusk (band), American psychedelic rock supergroup
 Lusk Committee of the New York State legislature, 1919